Henry Funkhouser Farm and Log House is a historic home located at Baker, Hardy County, West Virginia. Located on the property are the contributing log cabin; a log barn (c. 1880); and a cellarhouse (1938).  The log cabin was built about 1845, and is a two-story, side gable, single-pen house.  A kitchen addition was built about 1900.  Also on the property is the Funkhouser family cemetery.  The property remains in the Funkhouser family.

It was listed on the National Register of Historic Places in 2001.

References

Farms on the National Register of Historic Places in West Virginia
Houses on the National Register of Historic Places in West Virginia
Houses completed in 1845
Houses in Hardy County, West Virginia
National Register of Historic Places in Hardy County, West Virginia
Log buildings and structures on the National Register of Historic Places in West Virginia